Foda or FODA may be:
Feature-oriented domain analysis, a domain analysis method which introduced feature modelling to domain engineering
An item of Portuguese profanity
A colloquial name for Foshan University, Guangdong, China

People with the name Foda include:
Farag Foda, Egyptian human rights activist
Franco Foda, German footballer
Sandro Foda, German footballer
Yosri Fouda, Egyptian journalist, that may be pronounced as with "o"
Foday Kallay, leader of Westside Boys